The 1967 Football Championship of Ukrainian SSR (Class B) was the 37th season of association football competition of the Ukrainian SSR, which was part of the Ukrainian Class B. It was the seventeenth in the Soviet Class B and the fifth season of the Ukrainian Class B. 

The 1967 Football Championship of Ukrainian SSR (Class B) was won by FC Avtomobilist Zhytomyr.

Zone 1 (West)

Location map

Relegated teams
 none

Promoted teams
 FC Enerhiya Nova Kakhovka
 FC Energiya Tiraspol (1965 champions of the Football Championship of the Moldavian SSR)
 FC Stroitel Beltsy (1966 champions of the Football Championship of the Moldavian SSR)

Relocated and renamed teams
 FC Avtomobilist Zhytomyr was called as FC Polissya Zhytomyr
 FC Horyn Rovno was called as FC Kolhospnyk Rovno
 FC Dnipro Cherkasy was called as FC Kolhospnyk Cherkasy
 SC Prometei Dniprodzerzhynsk was called as FC Dniprovets Dniprodzerzhynsk

Final standings

Zone 2

Location map

Relegated teams
 none

Promoted teams
 FC Stal Dnipropetrovsk
 FC Sitall Kostiantynivka

Relocated and renamed teams
 none

Final standings

Final stage

See also
 Soviet Second League

External links
 1967 season regulations.  Luhansk football portal
 1967 Soviet championships (all leagues) at helmsoccer.narod.ru

1967
3
Soviet
Soviet
class B
1967 in Moldovan football
Football Championship of the Ukrainian SSR